Lord Johnston may refer to:

Alan Johnston, Lord Johnston, (1942–2008)
Douglas Johnston, Lord Johnston, (1907–1985)
Russell Johnston, Baron Russell-Johnston, (1932–2008)